M. Ayyakkannu (born 15 August 1927) was an Indian politician. He was born in Ladapuram village, Trichinopoly District. He was the son of S. Muthusamy. After studied at Annamalai University in Chidambaram and the Madras Law College, obtained a B.A. (Honours) degree. In 1949 he became the secretary of the Social Service League at Annamalai University, and became chairman of the History and Politics Association in 1951. He served as Secretary of the Madras Depressed Class Youth Association.

He married Bhuvanasweri in 1953 and had three children (two sons and one daughter). He was elected to the Lok Sabha (lower house of the parliament of India) from the Nagapattinam constituency in the 1957 Indian general election, contesting as the Indian National Congress candidate for the seat reserved for Scheduled Castes. In later years he lived in Annanagar West in Chennai.

References

1927 births
Possibly living people
India MPs 1957–1962
People from Nagapattinam district
Lok Sabha members from Tamil Nadu